Close Relations (Swedish: Tjocka släkten) is a 1935 Swedish comedy film directed by Sölve Cederstrand and starring Edvard Persson, Gideon Wahlberg and Dagmar Ebbesen. It was shot at the Sundbyberg Studios of Europa Film in Stockholm.

Cast
 Edvard Persson as Lasse Larsson	
 Gideon Wahlberg as Johan Jansson
 Dagmar Ebbesen as Fina Jansson
 Alice Carlsson as 	Laila
 Rut Holm as 	Mabel
 Carl-Gunnar Wingård as 	Fredrik
 Lili Ziedner as Sally
 Martin Sterner as 	Consul General Jansson
 Nils Jacobsson as 	Axel
 Helle Winther as Kolumbus
 Bertil Berglund as Burglar 
 Astrid Bodin as 	Lisa, maid 
 Estery Ericsson as Train passenger 
 Curt Lundvik as 	Axel's friend 
 Aurora Åström as Laila's friend

References

Bibliography 
 Wallengren, Ann-Kristin.  Welcome Home Mr Swanson: Swedish Emigrants and Swedishness on Film. Nordic Academic Press, 2014.

External links 
 

1935 films
Swedish comedy films
1935 comedy films
1930s Swedish-language films
Films directed by Sölve Cederstrand
Swedish black-and-white films
1930s Swedish films